Dorothy Sidney, Countess of Leicester (née Lady Dorothy Percy; ca. 1598 – 20 August 1659), was the eldest daughter of Henry Percy, 9th Earl of Northumberland, and his wife, Lady Dorothy Devereux. Her sister was the alleged intrigant Lucy Hay, Countess of Carlisle, and their eldest surviving brother was Algernon Percy, 10th Earl of Northumberland.

Lady Dorothy Percy married Robert Sidney, later Earl of Leicester, in 1615. The couple had twelve children, including:

Dorothy (1617–1683), married Henry Spencer, 1st Earl of Sunderland.
Philip (1619–1697), the 3rd Earl, married Lady Catherine Cecil.
Henry, created Earl of Romney, died unmarried and without issue.
Algernon, died unmarried and without issue.
Robert, died young.
Lucy (died 1685), married Sir John Pelham, 3rd Baronet.

References

External links
Entry at thePeerage.com

1590s births
1659 deaths
17th-century English nobility
17th-century English women
Daughters of British earls
English countesses
Dorothy
Dorothy